Euseius alangii is a species of mite in the family Phytoseiidae.

References

alangii
Articles created by Qbugbot
Animals described in 1981